Eilema elophus is a moth of the  subfamily Arctiinae. It was described from Volcan Island.

References

 Natural History Museum Lepidoptera generic names catalog

elophus